The Bangladeshi cricket team toured Zimbabwe for a two-match Test series and a three-match One Day International (ODI) series between 7 and 30 April 2001. Zimbabwe won the Test series 2–0 and the ODI series 3–0. It was Bangladesh's inaugural overseas Test series.

Squads

ODI series

1st ODI

2nd ODI

3rd ODI

Test series

1st Test

2nd Test

References

2001 in Bangladeshi cricket
2001 in Zimbabwean cricket
International cricket competitions in 2000–01
2000-01
Zimbabwean cricket seasons from 2000–01